R54 may refer to:
 R54 (South Africa), a road
 R-54 Landsberg/East, a former United States Air Force base in Germany
 R54: Toxic to flora, a risk phrase